The 2018–19 Gonzaga Bulldogs women's basketball team represents Gonzaga University in the 2018–19 NCAA Division I women's basketball season. The Bulldogs (also informally referred to as the "Zags"), are members of the West Coast Conference. The Bulldogs, led by fifth year head coach Lisa Fortier, play their home games at the McCarthey Athletic Center on the university campus in Spokane, Washington. They finished the season 29–5, 16–2 in WCC play to win the WCC regular season. They advanced to the WCC women's basketball tournament where they lost to BYU. They received at-large bid to the NCAA women's tournament where defeated Little Rock in the first round before losing to Oregon State.

Roster

Schedule

|-
!colspan=9 style=| Exhibition

|-
!colspan=9 style=| Non-conference regular season

|-
!colspan=9 style=| WCC regular season

|-
!colspan=9 style=| WCC Women's Tournament

|-
!colspan=9 style=| NCAA Women's Tournament

Rankings
2018–19 NCAA Division I women's basketball rankings

^Coaches did not release a Week 2 poll.

See also
2018–19 Gonzaga Bulldogs men's basketball team

References

Gonzaga
Gonzaga Bulldogs women's basketball seasons
Gonzaga
Gonzaga
Gonzaga